Anatetarte or Anotetarte (Ἀνωτετάρτη) was a town of ancient Caria. It became a bishopric; no longer the seat of a residential bishop, it remains a titular see of the Roman Catholic Church.

Its site is unlocated.

References

Populated places in ancient Caria
Catholic titular sees in Asia
Former populated places in Turkey
Roman towns and cities in Turkey
Lost ancient cities and towns